Indian is a 1996 Indian Tamil-language vigilante action film written and directed by Shankar and produced by A. M. Rathnam. The film stars Kamal Haasan in a dual role opposite Nedumudi Venu, Sukanya, Manisha Koirala and Urmila Matondkar. The film's score and soundtrack are composed by A. R. Rahman, while cinematography was handled by Jeeva. The film focuses on an ex-freedom fighter turned vigilante bent on rooting out corruption, and his son, who is at the other end of the spectrum by facilitating corrupt practices leading to some unfortunate events. He is well trained in Varma Kalai, an ancient lethal martial art used for close-quarters combat.

Indian was released on 9 May 1996 worldwide and opened to high critical acclaim on the way to becoming a major commercial success in the box office. It became the highest grossing Tamil film of all time and also the first film from Tamil and South India to gross 50 crore at worldwide box office. 

The film was selected by India as its entry for the Best Foreign Language Film for the Academy Awards in 1996, but was not nominated. The film also went on to win three National Film Awards including that of Best Actor for Kamal Haasan's portrayal, while his performance also saw him win at the Filmfare Awards and the Tamil Nadu film fare award.  It was the highest-grossing Tamil film upon its release, beating the collections of Baashha until surpassed by Padayappa three years later.

Plot
A series of murders take place in Avadi, Chennai, in the same pattern; stabbing by a knife. Each time the victim is paralysed before being killed. The Chennai Police Department, led by CBI officer Krishnaswamy suspects several people, and they narrow down the killer by his age, which should be more than 70 years based on the writing style of a letter left behind by the killer while murdering his most recent victim, an officer in the government treasury. The officer is killed by an old man who is later known to be Senapathy, a veteran Indian freedom fighter who was a member of the Indian National Army led by Subhas Chandra Bose, for threatening a poor old woman to bribe him to hand over compensation amount of  given by the government as her husband was killed in a riot.

Chandrabose alias Chandru is a small-time broker stationed outside the RTO at Chennai, who, along with his assistant Subbaiah, aid people in bribing the right officials inside the RTO for getting permits and licenses. Subbaiah and Paneerselvam, an RTO official, are engaged in regular conflicts with one another. At the same time, Aishwarya, Chandru's love interest and an avid animal rights activist, also comes into conflict with Sapna, a medical student and the daughter of an RTO official. Chandru attempts to win over Sapna and her family to secure a job as a brake inspector at the RTO. Aishwarya is irked by the fact that Sapna, as well as her mother, are exploiting Chandru's situation, getting him to do household chores, but eventually, Sapna realises that Chandru loves Aishwarya and gives up her love. It is revealed that Chandru is actually Senapathy's son. They both had fallen out due to Senapathy's excessive insistence on honesty and righteousness, which Chandru considers to be irrelevant in the present times. 

Meanwhile, Krishnaswamy manages to trace his way to Senapathy's house posing as a freedom fighter eligible for Swathantra Sainik Samman Pension Scheme. When he tries to arrest Senapathy, Senapathy and his wife Amirthavalli, a puppeteer, escape with his expertise in Varma Kalai. Senapathy then goes on to commit a murder in front of a live television audience by killing a corrupt doctor, who refused to treat Senapathy's daughter Kasturi, who was suffering from third-degree burns, because he insisted on a bribe which Senapathy refused, thus leading to her death. The public support surges for Senapathy as he exposes so many corrupt individuals. Senapathy does not do any favours for his son either. 

Chandru, who managed to bribe his way to a brake inspector job, takes a bribe and gives a safety certificate to a bus with faulty brakes, which eventually kills 40 school children, including the driver. Chandru tries to place the blame on the bus driver for drunk-drive and manages to bribe a police officer and a doctor on the same. However, Senapathy catches him in the act, and is bent on giving Chandru the same punishment that he gives others i.e. death. Despite pleas from Amirthavalli and Aishwarya to spare Chandru's life, Senapathy heads for the airport where Chandru is attempting to flee to Mumbai. A chase then culminates at the airport, where Senapathy tearfully kills his son and apparently dies in an explosion involving an aeroplane. However, Krishnaswamy, on investigating the recorded footage, discovers that Senapathy escaped moments before the jeep exploded.

The epilogue shows Senapathy calling Krishnaswamy from Hong Kong, indicating that he will be back whenever the need for his presence should arise.

Cast

Production

Soon after the release of Gentleman (1993), Shankar narrated a script titled Periya Manushan to actor Rajinikanth, but the pair did not end up collaborating. He then considered making the film in Telugu with Rajasekhar in a leading role, alongside either Nagarjuna or Venkatesh, but the plans did not materialise. In June 1995, producer A. M. Rathnam signed on Shankar to make the venture featuring leading actor Kamal Haasan in the lead role. The film, retitled as Indian, was initially reported to be loosely based on the life of prominent Indian freedom fighter, Subhas Chandra Bose.

Shankar tried to cast Aishwarya Rai to make her debut and portray the leading female role. Still, her commitment to her advertisement agency until October 1995 meant that she was unavailable to sign the film. Subsequently, Manisha Koirala, who appeared in the critically acclaimed 1995 Mani Ratnam film Bombay was selected as the lead heroine. The producers signed on Raadhika to play the pair of the older Kamal Haasan in the film, but her television commitments meant that she was unable to sign a contract. Urvashi's sister subsequently replaced her, only for Shankar to throw her out for missing a day's schedule to attend her wedding. The role was finally handed to Sukanya, who had previously appeared alongside Kamal Haasan in Mahanadhi. Bollywood actress Urmila Matondkar was signed to play a role in the film after the producers were impressed with her performance and the success of her 1995 Hindi film, Rangeela. Nassar was chosen to portray an important character in the film; however, as he was busy with other films, he could not accept the offer instead, he provided a voice for Nedumudi Venu. Then Shankar hired Malayalam famous character artist Nedumudi Venu to play the role. The producers engaged Hollywood make-up artistes Michael Westmore and Michael Jones to work on the designs for the senior Kamal Haasan's and Sukanya's look in the film.

For production work, Shankar visited Las Vegas to learn about new technology and purchased cameras for the production. Furthermore, the director visited Australia alongside cinematographer Jeeva and music director A. R. Rahman to location hunt and to compose tunes. The film's unit were given strict orders to maintain privacy, with Hindi actor Jackie Shroff being notably turned away from visiting the shooting spot. A song for the film was shot at Prasad Studios featuring Kamal Haasan and Urmila Matondkar alongside 70 Bombay models. This led to a protest from the Cine Dancers Union who argued that Tamil dancers should have been utilised instead, with Shankar opting to pay them off to avoid further hassle. Another duet between Kamal Haasan and Manisha Koirala was shot near the Sydney Opera House in Sydney and Canberra for fifteen days. A flashback song was canned with four hundred dancers and a thousand extras at Gingee with Kamal Haasan and Sukanya, while another song featured shooting in Jodhpur, Rajasthan. Graphic designer Venky noted that Indian was his most difficult project to date (in 1997) with a scene constructed to feature Kamal Haasan's character alongside freedom fighter, Subhas Chandra Bose. Venky had to remove blemishes on the film reel of Bose provided by the Film Division's archive before merging Kamal Haasan on to the shot to make it appear that the pair were marching in tandem.

It was the most expensive Indian film at the time. According to an estimate by film critic G. Dhananjayan, the production budget was ₹8 crore (worth ₹96 crore in 2021 prices). Rediff.com however estimated budget to be ₹15 crore. The music video for "Akadanu Naanga" directed by Padam Kumar and choreographed by Vaibhavi Merchant, cost ₹1.5 crore

Music

The soundtrack album includes five tracks composed by A. R. Rahman, and was released in 1996 by Pyramid.
 The soundtrack proved successful upon release and was also released in Hindi as Hindustani by TIPS and in Telugu as Bharateeyudu by T-Series. The lyrics were written by Vaali and Vairamuthu for the original version, P. K. Mishra for Hindustani and Bhuvanachandra for Bharateeyudu.

The Tamil soundtrack of Indian was a major success, having sold about 600,000 records within days of release. The Hindi soundtrack, called Hindustani, sold a further 1.8million units, bringing total sales to at least 2.4million units. Kappaleri Poyachu was shot at Gingee fort, Villupuram district, Tamil Nadu

Release
Indian was released worldwide on 9 May 1996 and opened to predominantly positive reviews from critics. Prior to the release of the film, the team also planned a Hindi version of the film. It was partially reshot in Hindi as Hindustani with Aruna Irani in place of Manorama. The Hindi version also did well after its release on 23 August 1996. The film was also dubbed in Telugu as Bharathyeedu and in Malayalam under the same title. In 2015, the Hindi version Hindustani was screened at the Habitat Film Festival.

Reception

Box office 
The film ran to packed houses for several months in Tamil Nadu. Indian was also dubbed into Telugu as Bharatheeyudu and in Hindi as Hindustani . Both Telugu and Hindi dubbed versions also became a major commercial success .

Critical response 

A critic from India Today praised Shankar's script, noting that "with the right mix of pop patriotism, anti-establishment diatribes and other commercial cinema ingredients, Shankar's latest creation has south India applauding" before adding that "the real triumph of the film is the effective make-over that believably transforms the actors". Another film critic wrote that "Indian represents Shankar's best effort to date both in terms of the effectiveness of the message he conveys and the entertainment value of the movie as a whole", adding that "the movie features a hardhitting message as well as a great performance from Kamal as an old freedom fighter with a new agenda, impressive special effects and extravagant song sequences." The film went on to win three National Film Awards: Best Actor for Kamal Haasan's portrayal, Best Art Direction for Thota Tharani's pre-independence sets and Best Special Effects for Venky's graphics work. It also achieved regional success, winning Best Film and Best Actor awards at both the Filmfare Awards and from the Tamil Nadu State. It also became the Indian submission for the Academy Award for Best Foreign Language Film in 1997, though eventually did not make the shortlist.

Accolades 
Indian was selected by India as its entry for the Best Foreign Language Film for the Academy Awards in 1996, but was not nominated.

Sequel

In 2011, producer A. M. Rathnam discussed the idea of a sequel to this project as anti-corruption leaders like Anna Hazare were becoming active. In September 2017, a sequel was announced jointly by Shankar and Haasan, with Dil Raju handling production. It entered production after Haasan completed work on Vishwaroopam II and Sabaash Naidu as Indian 2. The following month, Raju left the film which was then picked up by Lyca Productions. The film has Haasan reprising his role as the titular character along with new addition of actors including Siddharth, Kajal Aggarwal, and many others. The soundtrack will be scored by Anirudh Ravichander. Kabilan Vairamuthu will be rendering his service for dialogue.

See also
 List of Indian submissions for the Academy Award for Best International Feature Film
 List of submissions to the 69th Academy Awards for Best Foreign Language Film

References

External links
 

Films set in Chennai
Films shot in Chennai
Films featuring a Best Actor National Award-winning performance
Films about corruption in India
Films set in the Indian independence movement
1996 films
Films shot in Australia
Films shot in Rajasthan
Indian vigilante films
1990s Tamil-language films
Films scored by A. R. Rahman
Films directed by S. Shankar
Indian nonlinear narrative films
Films about rebellions
1990s vigilante films
1996 action thriller films
Indian action thriller films
Indian films about revenge
Kalarippayattu films
Central Bureau of Investigation in fiction
Fictional portrayals of the Tamil Nadu Police
Fictional revolutionaries
Films whose production designer won the Best Production Design National Film Award
Films that won the Best Special Effects National Film Award
Indian martial arts films
Indian National Army in fiction
1996 martial arts films